Juan Cruz de los Santos da Luz (born 22 February 2003) is a Uruguayan professional footballer who plays as a forward for Uruguayan Primera División club River Plate Montevideo.

References

External links
Profile at Sofa Score

2003 births
Living people
Club Atlético River Plate (Montevideo) players
Uruguayan footballers
Association football forwards